Amália no Olympia is a fado album recorded by Amália Rodrigues in 1957 on the EMI label. She was accompanied by musicians Domingos Camarinha on Portuguese guitar and Santos Moreira on viola.

Track listing

References

1957 albums
Amália Rodrigues albums